Sokolyne  is a village in Bakhchysarai Raion (district) of the Autonomous Republic of Crimea, a territory recognized by a majority of countries as part of Ukraine and incorporated by Russia as the Republic of Crimea. Population:

Gallery

References

External links
 

Villages in Crimea
Bakhchysarai Raion